Linda Nosková was the defending champion but chose to compete at the 2022 US Open qualifying instead.

Barbora Palicová won the title, defeating Sada Nahimana in the final, 6–2, 1–6, 6–0.

Seeds

Draw

Finals

Top half

Bottom half

References

External Links
Main Draw

Zubr Cup - Singles